Jerolim is a Croatian island in the Adriatic Sea, one of the Paklinski Islands southwest of Hvar.

Jerolim island is 5 minutes from Hvar town by taxi boat. Since the 1950s it is a naturist island, with clear sea, pine trees and restaurants

References 

Islands of the Adriatic Sea
Islands of Croatia
Uninhabited islands of Croatia
Landforms of Split-Dalmatia County